Temperance Town may refer to:

Temperance Towns, settlements founded by followers of the Temperance movement.
Temperance Town, Cardiff, the name of one such settlement.